The Pledge to Africa Act (the Act) (long title: An Act to amend the Patent Act and the Food and Drugs Act (The Jean Chrétien Pledge to Africa) is an Act of the Parliament of Canada. It was Bill C-9 of the third session of the 37th Canadian Parliament. The legislation amends the Patent Act and the Food and Drugs Act to implement Canada's Access to Medicines Regime.  It represented the first implementation of the TRIPS flexibilities declared in the August 30, 2003, General Council decision. Enacted in May 2004, it allows Canada to enact compulsory licenses to export essential medicines to countries without the capacity to manufacture their own. Other countries that have since enacted similar legislation include Norway and India.

Purpose

The purpose of the Act is to improve access to drugs for developing countries that lack the resources to manufacture the drugs and cannot afford to buy them at the usual market cost. The drugs that fight these diseases are expensive to create and manufacture and thus are usually unaffordable for those who need them the most.

The Pledge to Africa Act allows for the patents on these drugs to be overridden so that manufacturers can produce generic versions of the drug to sell in underdeveloped countries.

Criticisms

Some questions have been raised concerning the Act'''s efficacy, or lack thereof, at increasing the availability of pharmaceuticals in poor nations.Access to Drugs Initiative – History  It took a full year from the time the bill was introduced to the time that it came into effect. Since the Act came into effect in 2005, only one drug has been manufactured and exported under the act.  It has been suggested that this is because restrictions incorporated into the Act make it too difficult for generic drug companies to get permission to produce a generic and to export it to countries in need.  The process for obtaining patent exemptions under the Act is quite costly, and the exemption must be renewed every two years.  As such, it may not be economically viable for generic drug makers to apply for an exemption, or even if it is, the expense and mandated frequent renewals may tend to discourage generic makers from applying.  Additionally, exporting pharmaceuticals under the Act to countries that are not part of the World Trade Organization's TRIPS agreement is made more difficult by further restrictions.

 References and notes 

See also
 Canada's Access to Medicines Regime
 Patent Act''

External links
 http://www2.parl.gc.ca/HousePublications/Publication.aspx?Docid=2331620&file=4 — the full text of the Bill
 http://www.camr-rcam.gc.ca/ — the Canadian government site for the Regime
 http://www.aidslaw.ca/camr/
 https://web.archive.org/web/20070209020526/http://www.law.utoronto.ca/accesstodrugs/
 http://www.cptech.org/ip/health/c/canada/c9.html

Canadian federal legislation
Foreign relations of Canada
Canadian patent law
Pharmaceuticals policy
2004 in Canadian law
2004 in international relations
Health in Africa
2004 in Africa
37th Canadian Parliament